The State Bar of Montana is the integrated (mandatory) bar association of the US state of Montana.

Mission 
The association helps to:
maintain and improve the administration of justice
encourage attorneys to maintain high standards of integrity, learning, competence, public service, and conduct
safeguard a forum for the practice of law, the science of jurisprudence and law reform, and bar/public relations
provide for continuing legal education of members of the bar,
ensure that the legal profession's responsibilities to the public are more effectively discharged.

History 
In 1974, the State Bar of Montana was created by order of the Montana Supreme Court. Marshall H. Murray was the first president.

The predecessor to the State Bar of Montana was a voluntary organization, the Montana Bar Association, which was founded in 1885.

Structure
SBM is governed by a Board of Trustees, consisting of 16 members plus four officers, as elected by the membership. The Board hires an Executive Director to supervise the staff.

The Bar enforces the rule that Montana lawyers complete 15 credits each year.

Major MSB activities include:
 Lawyers Fund for Client Protection, which makes restitution in cases where an attorney has improperly appropriated client funds.
 Lawyer Referral Service, which helps the public find a lawyer
 Fee Arbitration Program to settle fee disputes between an attorney and a client 
 Financial support for legal services to the poor through the Montana Justice Foundation
 Practice-oriented sections addressing specialty interests
 Montana Lawyer, a monthly magazine.

References

Montana
Government of Montana
1974 establishments in Montana
Organizations established in 1974